This is a list of contestants who have appeared on the German television show Germany's Next Topmodel. Hosted by model Heidi Klum and her panel of judges. A number of aspiring models compete to win a modeling contract with a top modeling agency, along with other prizes.

The series first aired on January 25, 2006, and as of 2023, the show had featured 450 contestants with 358 eliminations (332 eliminations from the main panel and 26 eliminations from outside the judging panel), 41 withdrawals and 1 disqualification.

A total of seventeen models (Lena Gercke, Barbara Meier, Jennifer Hof, Sara Nuru, Alisar Ailabouni, Jana Beller, Luisa Hartema, Lovelyn Enebechi, Stefanie Giesinger, Vanessa Fuchs, Kim Hnizdo, Céline Bethmann, Toni Dreher-Adenuga, Simone Kowalski, Jacky Wruck, Alex-Mariah Peter, and Lou-Anne Gleißenebner-Teskey) having been crowned "Germany's Next Topmodel".

Contestants from all over Europe with German descent may apply to be on the show through casting calls, but the series has been known to recruit contestants from a myriad of various methods. In more recent years of the show, the production team has taken to scouting for contestants on various social media platforms, like Instagram or TikTok.

Contestants

Notes
 Contestant's ages are at the time of the season's filming.

Statistics
 Quitters: 41 - Céline Roscheck (Cycle 1), Sophie (Cycle 2), Alina (Cycle 2), Vanessa Hegelmaier (Cycle 3), Aline Kautz (Cycle 5), Valerie Blum (Cycle 6), Joana Damek (Cycle 6), Diana Ovchinnikova (Cycle 7), Evelyn Keck (Cycle 7), Merle Lambert (Cycle 8), Höpke Voss (Cycle 8), Bingyang Liu (Cycle 8), Sophie Jais (Cycle 8), Pauline Cottin (Cycle 9), Laura Haas (Cycle 9), Ina Bartak (Cycle 9), Fata Hasanovic (Cycle 9), Anna Wilken (Cycle 9), Sarah Kocar (Cycle 10), Annabel Paasch (Cycle 10), Luisa Bolghiran (Cycle 11), Laura Penelope Baumgärtner (Cycle 11), Julia Wulf (Cycle 11), Helena Fritz (Cycle 12), Greta Faeser (Cycle 12), Ivana Rajić-Hrnjić (Cycle 13), Olivia Rhode (Cycle 14), Kim Dammer (Cycle 14), Enisa Bukvic (Cycle 14), Vanessa Stanat (Cycle 14), Mareike Lerch (Cycle 15), Lijana Kaggwa (Cycle 15), Ricarda Häschke (Cycle 16), Sara Ullmann (Cycle 16), Mira Folster (Cycle 16), Jasmine Jüttner (Cycle 16), Romy Wolf (Cycle 16), Ashley Amegan (Cycle 16), Lenara Klawitter (Cycle 17), Sarah Benkhoff  (Cycle 18), and Tracy Cornelius (Cycle 18)
 Disqualifications: 1 - Jasmin Cadete (Cycle 14)
 Models eliminated outside of judging panel: 26 - Concetta Mazza (Cycle 6), Christien Fleischhauer (Cycle 6), Simone Rohrmüller (Cycle 6), Florence Lodevic (Cycle 6), Laura Scharnagl (Cycle 7), Katharina Oltzow (Cycle 8), Lisa-Giulia Wende (Season 8), Christina Wiessner (Cycle 12), Saskia Mächler (Cycle 12), Claudia Fiedler (Cycle 12), Aissatou Niang (Cycle 12), Anh Phuong Dinh Phan (Cycle 12), Selma Toroy (Cycle 13), Liane Polt (Cycle 13), Karoline Seul (Cycle 13), Gerda Lewis (Cycle 13), Shari Streich (Cycle 13), Klaudia Giez (Cycle 13), Sara Leutenegger (Cycle 13), Sarah Almoril (Cycle 14), Cassandra Feliciano (Cycle 15), Marie Rathay (Cycle 15), Tamara Hitz (Cycle 15), Linda Braunberger (Cycle 16), Melissa Stöbke  (Cycle 18), and Slata Schneider (Cycle 18)
 Personality Award winners: 5 - Klaudia Giez (Cycle 13), Tatjana Wiedemann  (Cycle 14), Tamara Hitz (Cycle 15), Liliana Maxwell  (Cycle 16), and Sophie Dräger  (Cycle 17)

References

Germany's Next Topmodel
Germany's Next Topmodel contestants
Top Model contestants